Gilbert Livingston may refer to:

 Gilbert Livingston (1690–1746), county clerk and member of the New York General Assembly
 Gilbert Livingston (legislator) (1742–1806), lawyer and delegate to the Poughkeepsie Convention
 Gilbert Livingston (cricketer) (1877–?), West Indian cricketer